In the United Kingdom, and formerly the Republic of Ireland, a P45 is the reference code of a document titled Details of employee leaving work.  The term is used in British and Irish slang as a metonym for termination of employment. The equivalent slang term in the United States is "pink slip".

A P45 is issued by the employer when an employee leaves work.

In the United Kingdom 
In the UK, the front section, Part 1, is given by the old employer to HM Revenue and Customs, who then record the pay and tax details on to the individual's taxpayer record. Part 1A is to be retained by the employee, Part 2 retained by the new employer, and Part 3 taken by the new employer and sent to their tax office.  The P45 contains details of earnings and tax paid during the tax year (tax paid in previous years is detailed on the P60 for that year).

The "P" code refers to documents in the PAYE series, in the same way that self-assessment documents are prefixed "SA" (e.g., SA100 - Individual tax return) and tax credits paperwork is prefixed "TC" (e.g., TC600 - Tax credits application).

In the Republic of Ireland
In the Republic of Ireland, P45 was also used as a reference to a form used by the Revenue Commissioners with the same function. The administrative procedures in this area were similar; however, the form itself was different in design from the UK version. The form was eliminated from 1 January 2019, having been replaced by a real-time reporting of tax details to Revenue.

In popular culture
On 27 June 2007, the day of his resignation as Prime Minister, Tony Blair jokingly remarked during his final Prime Minister's Questions about receiving his P45:
 

On 4 October 2017, at the annual Conservative Party conference in Manchester, Prime Minister Theresa May was handed a P45 form by prankster Simon Brodkin as a stunt claiming to be from then-Foreign Secretary Boris Johnson. Brodkin was arrested, but no charges were brought.

See also
Taxation in the United Kingdom
United Kingdom labour law
P60

References

External links
PAYE forms: P45, P60, P11D GOV.UK information
PAYE forms: P45, P46, P60, P11D Directgov pages in the UK National Archives
E13 Day to Day Payroll Additional United Kingdom information
 Republic of Ireland information
 DTD for online submission of P45 in XML format

Taxation in the United Kingdom
Taxation in the Republic of Ireland
United Kingdom labour law
British English
Slang
Tax forms
Irish slang